This is a list of rural localities in Pskov Oblast, Russia. Pskov Oblast is a federal subject of Russia (an oblast). Pskov Oblast is a federal subject of Russia (an oblast), located in the west of the country. Its administrative center is the city of Pskov. As of the 2010 Census, its population was 673,423. Pskov Oblast borders the countries of Estonia, Latvia, and Belarus. It is the westernmost federal subject of contiguous Russia (i.e. excluding the exclave of Kaliningrad Oblast), and one of the only two bordering with three countries.

Gdovsky District 
Rural localities in Gdovsky District:

 Apalyovo
 Blyansk
 Dragotina
 Glush
 Kunest
 Lunevshchina
 Potrekhnovo
 Strektovo
 Uldiga
 Vetvenik
 Yamm
 Yushkino
 Yushkinskaya Volost

Novorzhevsky District 
Rural localities in Novorzhevsky District:

 Davydkovo

Opochetsky District 
Rural localities in Opochetsky District:

 Abrosimovo

Ostrovsky District 
Rural localities in Ostrovsky District:

 Avdyatovo

Palkinsky District 
Rural localities in Palkinsky District:

 Sharanski

Pechorsky District 
Rural localities in Pechorsky District:

 Dubki
 Izborsk
 Lavry

Plyussky District 
Rural localities in Plyussky District:

 Bolshoye Zakhonye
 Kotoshi
 Lositsy
 Maryinsko
 Serbino
 Trosno

Pskovsky District 
Rural localities in Pskovsky District:

 Abrosovo
 Abryushino
 Borovik

Pytalovsky District 
Rural localities in Pytalovsky District:

 Vyshgorodok

Sebezhsky District 
Rural localities in Sebezhsky District:

 Zasitino

Strugo-Krasnensky District 
Rural localities in Strugo-Krasnensky District:

 Mayakovo
 Mogutovo
 Simansky Log
 Uzmino
 Vladimirsky Lager

Velikoluksky District 
Rural localities in Velikoluksky District:

 Grebly
 Krivandino
 Mikhalki
 Pereslegino

See also
 
 Lists of rural localities in Russia

References

Pskov Oblast